Eli Yablonovitch (born 15 December 1946) is an American physicist and engineer who, along with Sajeev John founded the field of photonic crystals in 1987. He and his team were the first to create a 3-dimensional structure that exhibited a full photonic bandgap, which has been named Yablonovite. In addition to pioneering photonic crystals, he was the first to recognize that a strained quantum-well laser has a significantly reduced threshold current compared to its unstrained counterpart. This is now employed in the majority of semiconductor lasers fabricated throughout the world. His seminal paper reporting inhibited spontaneous emission in photonic crystals is among the most highly cited papers in physics and engineering.

Education
Yablonovitch received his B.Sc. in physics from McGill University in 1967.  He went on to receive his A.M. degree in applied physics from Harvard University in 1969, and his Ph.D. from Harvard in 1972. During his post-graduate studies, Yablonovitch worked on nonlinear optics with carbon dioxide lasers.

Career
After receiving his Ph.D., Yablonovitch worked at Bell Laboratories.  He then became a professor of applied physics at Harvard in 1974.  In 1979, he joined Exxon research center to work on photovoltaic research for solar energy. While working at Exxon, Yablonovitch derived the 4 (n squared) factor as the theoretical limit for light trapping in photovoltaics. This is now used worldwide in almost all solar panels.

Yablonovitch joined Bell Communications Research in 1984, and became its director of solid-state physics research in 1991. During his time at Bell Communications, Yablonovitch did his pioneering work on photonic crystals.

Yablonovitch became a professor of electrical engineering at UCLA and continued to study and develop photonic crystals and photonic bandgap materials. In July 2007, he joined the Electrical Engineering and Computer Sciences department at UC Berkeley. His research topics include silicon photonics, telecommunications, optical antennas, new applications of photovoltaics, and searching for a low-voltage replacement for the transistor. Recently he has investigated analog computing approaches to solving hard problems, such as the traveling salesman problem.

Yablonovitch has co-founded multiple companies related to his research interests. In 2000, he co-founded Ethertronics Inc. Ethertronics is a cell phone antenna manufacturer that has, to date, shipped over 1.7 billion antennas.

In 2001, Yablonovitch co-founded Luxtera Inc., a semiconductor company that makes electro‑optical systems using silicon photonics, manufactured with CMOS processes. Luxtera is the first company to market foundry-based silicon photonics.

Yablonovitch co-founded Luminescent Inc. in 2002.  Luminescent provided sophisticated mathematical optimization for use in photolithography masks.   Luminescent was acquired by Synopsys in 2012.

In 2008, Yablonovitch founded Alta Devices Inc.  Alta Devices produces thin-film gallium arsenide photovoltaic cells for solar energy.  Alta Devices currently holds the efficiency world record for single junction solar cells at 29.1% and dual junction solar cells at 31.6%, both at 1 sun illumination.

He is a Fellow of the IEEE, the OSA, and the APS.

He was elected a member of the National Academy of Sciences, the National Academy of Engineering, the National Academy of Inventors, the American Academy of Arts and Sciences, and a Foreign Member of the Royal Society of London.

He is a recipient of the Benjamin Franklin medal; the  Frederic Ives Medal / Jarus W. Quinn Prize—the Optical Society's highest award; the IEEE Edison Medal; the Isaac Newton Medal; the IEEE "William R. Cherry Award"—the IEEE's highest award in solar cells; the Oliver E. Buckley Condensed Matter Prize; the Rank Prize; the Harvey Prize; the IEEE Photonics Award; the Mountbatten Medal of the British IET;  the R. W. Wood Prize; the W. Streifer Scientific Achievement Award; the Julius Springer Prize; and the  Adolph Lomb Medal.

See also
 Alf Adams. Introduced the idea of the Strained Laser at nearly the same time as Yablonovitch.

References

External links
Eli Yablonovitch's Research Group Website at UC Berkeley
Faculty Web Page at UC Berkeley
Researcher Bio Page at CITRIS
Energy Efficiency Electronics Science NSF Center

1946 births
Living people
21st-century American physicists
Members of the United States National Academy of Sciences
UC Berkeley College of Engineering faculty
Fellows of the American Academy of Arts and Sciences
Members of the United States National Academy of Engineering
Foreign Members of the Royal Society
Harvard School of Engineering and Applied Sciences alumni
Jewish American physicists
McGill University Faculty of Science alumni
American people of Austrian-Jewish descent
Optical physicists
Optical engineers
Oliver E. Buckley Condensed Matter Prize winners
IEEE Edison Medal recipients
21st-century American Jews
Fellows of the American Physical Society